Anthony Mantha (born September 16, 1994) is a Canadian professional ice hockey forward who is currently playing for the Washington Capitals of the National Hockey League (NHL). Mantha was drafted 20th overall by the Detroit Red Wings in the 2013 NHL Entry Draft.

Playing career

Junior
As a youth, Mantha played in the 2007 Quebec International Pee-Wee Hockey Tournament with the Collège-Français Rive-Sud minor ice hockey team. He was drafted 76th overall in the 2010 QMJHL Entry Draft by the Val-d'Or Foreurs.

During the 2010–11 season, Mantha made his QMJHL debut in December, appearing in two games with Val-d'or, spending most of the season with the College Charles-Lemoyne Riverains in Quebec's midget AAA league.

During the 2011–12 season, Mantha played in 63 games for Val-d'or in his first full year in the QMJHL. Mantha finished with 22 goals and 29 assists.

During the 2012–13 season, Mantha was Val-d'or's second leading scorer, behind Pittsburgh Penguins prospect Anton Zlobin, in his second season with the club. He led the QMJHL with 50 goals and had 39 assists in 67 games and was plus-21. Mantha was rewarded for his outstanding play by being invited to participate in the 2013 CHL Top Prospects Game, and being named to the QMJHL Second All-Star Team.

During the 2013–14 season, Mantha played in 57 games for Val-d'or and led the QMJHL in scoring, finishing with 57 goals and 63 assists. Mantha was awarded the first star of the month for September, where he recorded 14 points in five games, including four goals and an assist in a game against the Quebec Remparts on September 28. Mantha was awarded the first star of the month for October, where he recorded 25 points in 10 games. Mantha recorded back-to-back five-point games on October 11 and 12 against the Sherbrooke Phoenix and Drummondville Voltigeurs. In total, Mantha registered seven games of two points or more. Mantha was rewarded for his outstanding play by earning the Jean Béliveau Trophy as the top scorer in the QMJHL, the Michel Brière Memorial Trophy as the Most Valuable Player in the QMJHL, and the CHL Player of the Year.

During the playoffs, Mantha was the leading scorer for Val-d'or, recording 24 goals and 14 assists in 24 games. Mantha was awarded the CHL player of the week for the playoff period ending May 13, after recording 11 points in the final five games of the QMJHL Finals. Mantha scored the game-winning goal with 52 seconds remaining in the third period of game seven to defeat Baie-Comeau Drakkar and win the President's Cup.

Professional

Detroit Red Wings
On October 12, 2013, the Detroit Red Wings signed Mantha to a three-year entry-level contract.

Mantha began the 2014–15 season on the injured reserve list, after fracturing his right tibia on September 15, during a game at the Traverse City Prospect Tournament. It was announced he would be out for six to eight weeks. He made his professional debut for the Grand Rapids Griffins on November 14, 2014, in a game against the Texas Stars. He became the second-highest Detroit draft pick to play for the Griffins, behind only Jakub Kindl (19th overall in 2005). In his second AHL game, also against the Texas Stars, he scored his first professional goal against Jussi Rynnäs.

On February 17, 2016, Mantha recorded his first career hat-trick in a game against the Milwaukee Admirals.

On March 14, 2016, Mantha was recalled by the Detroit Red Wings. Prior to being recalled, he ranked third on the Griffins in scoring with 21 goals and 24 assists in 56 games. He made his NHL debut the following day in a game against the Philadelphia Flyers. On March 24, he scored first career NHL goal against Ben Scrivens of the Montreal Canadiens. On April 10, he was returned to the Griffins. Mantha played 10 games for the Red Wings, recording two goals, one assist and 18 shots on goal while averaging 11:42 time on ice.

On November 11, 2016, Mantha was recalled by the Red Wings. Prior to being recalled, he was tied for the AHL lead in goals with eight goals in 10 games. He also led the Griffins in points (10), power-play goals (4) and shots (34).

On October 5, 2017, Mantha scored the first goal at Little Caesars Arena, with an assist from captain Henrik Zetterberg. On March 31, 2019, Mantha recorded his first career NHL hat-trick in a game against the Boston Bruins.

On October 6, 2019, Mantha scored four goals in Detroit's 2019–20 home opener against the Dallas Stars, including a natural hat-trick. He became the second player in franchise history to score four or more goals in a home opener, and the first since John Sorrell in 1933. He also became the 23rd different player in franchise history with a four-goal game, and the first since Johan Franzén in 2011. Mantha was named NHL's Second Star of the Week on October 8, 2019.

On November 3, 2020, the Red Wings signed Mantha to a four-year, $22.8 million contract.

Washington Capitals
On April 12, 2021, Mantha was traded to the Washington Capitals in exchange for Jakub Vrána, Richard Pánik, a first-round pick in 2021 and second-round pick in 2022.

On April 18, 2021, Mantha became the first Washington Capital in history to score a goal in each of his first four games with the club.

On December 13, 2022, Mantha assisted on Alex Ovechkin 800th career goal. Ovechkin is the 3rd player in NHL history to reach 800 career goals.

International play

In 2012, Mantha represented team Canada at the IIHF World U18 Championship, where he won a bronze medal. Mantha recorded one goal in seven games.

In 2014, Mantha represented team Canada at the IIHF World Junior Ice Hockey Championships. Mantha was the leading-scorer for Canada, recording five goals and six assists in seven games, and was named to the 2014 WJC All-Star Team.

On April 29, 2019, Mantha was named to the Team Canada roster for the 2019 IIHF World Championship held in Slovakia. He helped Canada progress through to the playoff rounds before losing the final to Finland to finish with the Silver Medal on May 26, 2019. Mantha finished the tournament, tied for first in scoring alongside Mark Stone, with 14 points in 9 games and was selected as a top 3 player for Canada.

Personal life
Mantha's grandfather is four-time Stanley Cup winner Andre Pronovost.

Anthony's older sister, Elizabeth Mantha, became one of the first 10 female officials in American Hockey League history in October, 2021, when she refereed the Laval Rocket vs. Rochester Americans game in Laval, Quebec.

Career statistics

Regular season and playoffs

International

Awards and achievements

Records

Val-d'Or Foreurs
Mantha holds or shares a number of individual junior records:
 Three fastest goals in one period by one player (2:56).
 Most goals by a rookie in one game, away (3).
 Most points by a rookie in one game, away (4).
 Most goals by a player in one period (3).
 Most shorthanded goals by a player in one game (2).
 Most shorthanded goals by a player in one season (5).
 Most consecutive games with at least one point in one season (23).
 Most playoff games by a player in one post-season (24).
 Most playoff goals by a rookie in one game (2).
 Most playoff goals by a player in one game (3).
 Most shorthanded goals by a player in one post-season (2).
 Most career playoff assists by a player, away (15).

References

External links 
 

1994 births
Living people
Canadian ice hockey forwards
Detroit Red Wings draft picks
Detroit Red Wings players
Grand Rapids Griffins players
Ice hockey people from Quebec
National Hockey League first-round draft picks
Sportspeople from Longueuil
Val-d'Or Foreurs players
Washington Capitals players